The Tower of London Range is a sub-range of the Northern Rocky Mountains in northern British Columbia, Canada, located northwest of the Tuchodi Lakes at the northwest end of the Northern Rocky Mountains Provincial Park to the southwest of Fort Nelson.

Name origin
The range is named for the Tower of London, with its subsidiary peaks are named for towers and buildings within the Tower.  Names were conferred by members of the 1959-60 expedition to this area by the City of London Regiment of the Royal Fusiliers, commanded by Captain M.F.R. Jones.  
Mountains named after the Tower include Tower Mountain, which overlooks the south end of Wokkpash Lake, South Bastion Mountain, North Bastion Mountain, Constable Peak and The White Tower.
Related names include Fusilier Peak, Fusiliers Glacier, Byward Peak and other names not specific to the Tower of London.

References

Mountain ranges of British Columbia
Ranges of the Canadian Rockies
Fort Nelson Country